Shama Parveen is an Indian international kabaddi player. She was born in Dariyapur panchayat of Mokama, Bihar. She started playing Kabbadi from 2008 and has won several laurels at different levels. She also represented India in gold winning Asian Kabbadi championship team in 2017. She has also been appointed as district icon of Election Commission of India for Patna, Bihar.

References 

Indian kabaddi players
Female kabaddi players
Living people
Year of birth missing (living people)